Calvin is a hamlet within Lawrence County, Arkansas.

It is at the intersection of U.S. Route 67 and Lawrence Road 548 to the west and Lawrence Road 730.

Unincorporated communities in Arkansas